Little Barford is a hamlet and civil parish in the Borough of Bedford in Bedfordshire, England about  northeast of the county town of Bedford.

The 2011 census combines other data for Little Barford with Wyboston, Chawston and Colesden civil parish but its population is separately shown as 44.

Little Barford Power Station is to the north of the village.

Geography

The East Coast Mainline railway runs north–south through the parish.

Area

The parish's northern boundary is the A428 road, Cambridgeshire is to the east and Central Bedfordshire to the south. The River Great Ouse forms its western boundary.

Landscape

The hamlet lies within the Bedfordshire and Cambridgeshire Claylands as designated by Natural England. Bedford Borough Council classifies the local landscape  as the Great Ouse Clay Valley around and west of the village, and the eastern part of the parish as within the Biggin Wood Clay Vale that extends northwards from Central Bedfordshire. The surrounding area is mostly arable farmland. The northernmost part of the parish between the railway and the Great Ouse is taken up by the power station and industrial units.

Cottages

A row of four Grade II listed 18th century rough cast, thatched cottages stand by the roadside. One is detached, the remainder are terraced. At the northern end of the hamlet are four pairs of late 19th century semi-detached estate cottages having yellow brickwork with red brick dressings.

Elevation

Geology and soil type

The hamlet lies mainly on first and second terrace river gravel and glacial gravel. Boulder clay is to the east. Alluvium borders the Great Ouse. Underlying these superficial deposits and also in part at the surface is Oxford clay and Kellaways beds.

Around the hamlet the soil has low fertility, is freely draining and slightly acid with a loamy texture. The eastern part of the parish has highly fertile, lime-rich loamy and clayey soils with impeded drainage. By the Great Ouse are loamy and clayey floodplain soils with naturally high groundwater.

The night sky and light pollution

Light pollution is the level of radiance (night lights) shining up into the night sky. The Campaign to Protect Rural England (CPRE) divides the level of night sky brightness into 9 bands with band 1 being the darkest i.e. with the lowest level of light pollution and band 9 the brightest and most polluted. Little Barford in bands 6 and 7 is adversely affected by lighting at the power station and Arlington Road Industrial Estate. The night sky is darker looking southeast.

Public footpaths

The sole public footpath runs from opposite the last cottage at the northern end of the hamlet to the Ouse and onwards to link with the Ouse Valley Way.

History

The manor of Barford was held by the de Leyham family  from about 1194, and then passed by inheritance into the de la Dale family in about 1316: the de la Dales owned Barford for two centuries, after which it passed by inheritance to the Fettiplace family, and subsequently to the Brownes.

A deserted medieval settlement in fields near to St Deny's Church is visible as earthworks on historic aerial photographs.

The parish church is dedicated to Saint Denys. The church became redundant in 1972 and is now in the care of the Churches Conservation Trust.

A school was built in 1872. It became a council school in 1914 and closed in 1932, but reopened from 1939 to 1945. The building still stands.

The coal fired Little Barford Power Station was opened in 1939, closed in 1981 and demolished in 1989. A new gas fired plant was built in 1994–96.

Businesses
The Alington Road estate has an office centre, units for a number of service companies, and a Marshall Motor Group dealership. Laing O'Rourke has premises on Barford Road including land for storing cranes. Waste disposal company Biffa also has a depot.

Notable residents

Thomas de la Dale, Lord Chief Justice of Ireland, was born here  in about 1317
Nicholas Rowe, the dramatic poet, was born in "Rowe's Cottage" in 1674.
Artist Mike Chaplin, known to many as resident art expert on Watercolour Challenge was born in the village in 1943.

Notes

External links
Bedfordshire Archive:Little Barford

Villages in Bedfordshire
Civil parishes in Bedfordshire
Borough of Bedford